Fayette County Courthouse is a historic courthouse located at Connersville, Fayette County, Indiana, United States.  It was built in 1890, and is a -story, Romanesque Revival style red brick building.  It encompasses the earlier 1849 courthouse in its construction.  It features a circular corner clock tower and topped by a steep conical spire.

It was added to the National Register of Historic Places in 2006.

References

Clock towers in Indiana
County courthouses in Indiana
Courthouses on the National Register of Historic Places in Indiana
Romanesque Revival architecture in Indiana
Government buildings completed in 1890
Buildings and structures in Fayette County, Indiana
National Register of Historic Places in Fayette County, Indiana
1890 establishments in Indiana